Yury Alexandrovich Kuznetsov (born September 3, 1946) is a Soviet and Russian film and theater actor, recipient of the Meritorious Artist award of Russia.

Biography
Yury Kuznetsov was born on September 3, 1946, in Abakan, Khakass Autonomous Oblast, Russian SFSR, Soviet Union. He started a theatrical career and was a member of the following institutions:
1969 — 1979: Khabarovsk Drama
1979 — 1986: 
1986 — 1999: 

He received the award of Meritorious Artist in 2006.

Selected films
1984: My Friend Ivan Lapshin (Мой друг Иван Лапшин) as Superintendent
1985: Confrontation (Противостояние) as police major Zhukov
1986: Breakthrough (Прорыв) as sinker Vyazigin
1988: Cold Summer of 1953 (Холодное лето пятьдесят третьего…) as Ivan Zotov, director of trading post
1990: Afghan Breakdown (Афганский излом) as Shchup
1991: Genius (Гений) as police major Kuzmin 
1991: The Man Who Doesn't Return (Невозвращенец) as Andrey Korneyev
1995: What a Wonderful Game (Какая чудная игра) as Filimon Semenovich
1997: Brother (Брат) as Nemets (the German)
1997 — 2003: Streets of Broken Lights (Улицы разбитых фонарей) as Petrenko
1998: The Circus Burned Down, and the Clowns Have Gone (Цирк сгорел, и клоуны разбежались) as cossack
1999: Women's Property (Женская собственность) as Kolosov
2000: Peculiarities of the National Hunt in Winter Season (Особенности национальной охоты в зимний период) as Yuri Kurtsov
2000: The Christmas Miracle (Рождественская мистерия)
2001: Mechanical Suite (Механическая сюита) as pathologist
2002: Antikiller (Антикиллер) as Krylov
2003: Peculiarities of National Politics (Особенности национальной политики) as Stepan Nikolaevich
2006: The Island (Остров) as Tikhon
2009: Tsar (Царь) as Malyuta Skuratov
2016: The Duelist (Дуэлянт) as servant Kolychev
2019: To the Lake (Эпидемия) as Boris Mikhailovich

References

Sources

Kynoslovar.  Т.2.  Vol.2. Ed., 2001. - P.94-95.

1946 births
Living people
People from Abakan
Soviet male film actors
Soviet male television actors
Soviet male stage actors
Russian male film actors
Russian male television actors
Russian male stage actors
20th-century Russian male actors
21st-century Russian male actors
Honored Artists of the Russian Federation